Michiyuki or  is a type of scene in traditional Japanese theater that depicts characters dancing or conversing while traveling.

Michiyuki may also refer to:

 Michiyuki (garment), a type of overcoat worn with kimono on long-distance journeys 
 Matsuda Michiyuki (1839-1882), Japanese bureaucrat and statesman
 Michiyuki Kawashima (1969-2016), vocalist of the electronic music group Boom Boom Satellites

See also
 Travel (disambiguation)
 , a route in Jerusalem believed to be the path that Jesus walked on the way to his crucifixion

Jackets
Japanese masculine given names